The 1976 African Cup Winners' Cup was the second edition of Africa's secondary interclub competition. The tournament was played by 20 teams and used a knock-out format with ties played home and away.
Shooting Stars F.C. from Nigeria won the final, and claimed their - and their country's - first African club trophy.

Preliminary round

|}

First round

|}

Quarterfinals

|}

Semifinals

|}

Final

|}

Champion

External links
African Cup Winners' Cup results at Rec.Sport.Soccer Statistics Foundation

African Cup Winners' Cup
2